Thomas's nectar bat (Hsunycteris thomasi) is a bat species from South and Central America. Thomas's nectar bat pollinates the vine Marcgravia.

References

Bats of South America
Hsunycteris
Bats of Brazil
Mammals of Colombia
Mammals described in 1904
Taxa named by Joel Asaph Allen